Pailou may refer to:

Paifang, a traditional Chinese architectural form like an archway

Towns 
Pailou, Chizhou, in Guichi District, Chizhou, Anhui
Pailou, Jingmen, in Dongbao District, Jingmen, Hubei
Pailou, Haicheng, Liaoning

Townships
Pailou Township, Qianshan County, in Qianshan County, Anhui
Pailou Township, Weichang County, in Weichang Manchu and Mongol Autonomous County, Hebei

Villages
Pailou, in Shawo Township, Echeng, Ezhou, Hubei